The Pasadena via Oak Knoll Line was an interurban route of the Pacific Electric Railway. It operated from 1906 until 1950, between Downtown Los Angeles and Downtown Pasadena, California. Cars ran as far as Altadena during rush hours.

History

The route was originally built in 1906 to reach the Wentworth Hotel (later Huntington Hotel) in Oak Knoll from El Molino and was thusly known as the Wentworth Line, a designation it retained for some time. It tied into the Monrovia–Glendora Line. The routing through Pasadena was changed in 1913 to Lake Avenue, Colorado Street, Raymond Avenue, and through the car house on Fair Oaks Avenue. A further rerouting in downtown Los Angeles occurred on December 3, 1916. The outbound terminus was changed for all trips to Altadena between October 1928 and May 1929. The routing was reverted after that, but rear cars of a few rush hour trains continued until January 18, 1941.

Congestion at the Pacific Electric Building during World War II forced Oak Knoll Line trains to utilize a loop route around Downtown instead of running directly to the terminal building starting in July 1943. Trains would continue to run to the Main Street Terminal every New Years Day to serve passengers traveling to the Tournament of Roses Parade. The loop line was discontinued on October 5, 1947.

Service was largely discontinued after October 8, 1950 with a single round trip operating between Pasadena and El Molino to maintain the franchise. This ended after December 28. It was the second to last Pacific Electric line to be decommissioned in Pasadena, and was the last line to run along Colorado Boulevard.

By 1981, the tracks along the entirety of the route had been removed.

Route
The line followed the Monrovia–Glendora Line to the end of the quadruple-track system at El Molino Junction. From that point (at Huntington Drive), two tracks in a private right of way ran northerly on Oak Knoll Avenue to the Huntington Hotel. At this point, the line proceeded north in the pavement of city streets, running on Oak Knoll Avenue and South Lake Avenue as far as Colorado Street. It then turned west and ran on Colorado Street through the Pasadena business district to Fair Oaks Avenue. Here, the line turned north and ran on Fair Oaks Avenue several blocks to the terminus of the route at the North Fair Oaks Carhouse.

List of major stations

References

External links
Last run to Pasadena (photograph) 

Pacific Electric routes
History of Pasadena, California
History of Los Angeles County, California
Light rail in California
Railway lines opened in 1906
1906 establishments in California
Railway services discontinued in 1950
1950 disestablishments in California
Closed railway lines in the United States